Star Jr. (born November 15, 1993) is a Mexican luchador enmascarado (or masked professional wrestler), currently working for the Mexican professional wrestling promotion Consejo Mundial de Lucha Libre (CMLL). He portrays a tecnico ("Good guy") wrestling character. Star Jr.'s real name is not a matter of public record, as is often the case with masked wrestlers in Mexico where their private lives are kept a secret from the wrestling fans. Star Jr. is the son of professional wrestler Isaías Hernández Muñoz, who is better known under the ring name Star Boy, and previously worked as "Star Boy Jr." prior to working for CMLL. He has previously also worked under the ring names Apolo Múñoz (after his father) and Tigre Mágico II (after one of his trainers).

Professional wrestling career
In Mexico luchador enmascarados (masked professional wrestler) protect their true identity, often not revealing many details unless they are unmasked, but the wrestler later known as Star Jr. revealed in interviews that he previously wrestled under the ring names Apolo Múñoz and Tigre Mágico II. The name Múñoz was used in tribute to his father Isaías Hernández Muñoz and he used Tigre Mágico II while teaming with one of his trainers, Tigre Mágico. By 2012 he was known as Star Boy Jr. taking the ring name of his father who was known as "Star Boy". In early 2012 he represented Gym Tony Rivera in International Wrestling Revolution Group (IWRG) in the IWRG Copa Higher Power tournament, where his team defeated "Gym IWRG". Following the tournament victory Star Boy Jr. made regular appearances for IWRG including working on IWRG's 2012 Guerra del Golfo ("Gulf War") major event. In the opening match he teamed up with Galaxy to take on Guerrero Mixtico Jr. and Matrix Jr., during which Galaxy dislocated his shoulder, forcing the match to end early. After the short match Star Boy Jr. also wrestled in the second match of the night, replacing Tritón who was originally scheduled for the match. Star Boy Jr. and Chicano defeated Pacto Negro and The Mummy. On April 14, 2012 Star Boy Jr. was one of 16 men who risked their mask or hair on the outcome of a steel Cage match as part of a high-profile IWRG storyline between "Gym Rivera" and '"Gym IWRG". Star Boy Jr. escaped the cage, keeping his mask safe while Batman del Futuro ("Batman of the Future") lost the match and was unmasked as a result. Star Boy Jr. made another appearance at a major IWRG when he teamed up with Sauroman in the opening match, only to lose to Alan Extreme and Polifacetico at IWRG's 2012 Caravan de Campeones.

Consejo Mundial de Lucha Libre (2014–present)

Star Boy Jr. began working for Consejo Mundial de Lucha Libre (CMLL) in early 2014, making his CMLL debut on January 6, 2014 under the shortened ring name "Star Jr." teaming up with Robin and Meyer to defeat El Rebelde, Espíritu Maligno and King Jaguar. In CMLL Star Jr. received further training from one of CMLL's resident trainers Franco Colombo, helping him gain further experience and adjust to CMLL's working environment. Star Jr. was one of 14 "rookies" entered in the 2014 Torneo Gran Alternativa ("The Great Alternative tournament"), an annual tournament in CMLL where a rookie is teamed up with a veteran wrestler for a tag team tournament. Star Jr. competed in Block B of the tournament, teaming with veteran Atlantis on February 7, 2014. The block began with a battle royal elimination match to determine the other of the actual tag team matches. Star Jr. and El Rebelde outlasted the other rookies in the block, Black Panther, Canelo Casas, Cavernario, Dragon Lee, Espiritu Negro, Hechicero and Herodes Jr. In the actual tournament Star Jr. and Atlantis lost to El Rebelde and Averno in the first round. In March Star Jr. entered that year's En Busca de un Ídolo ("In search of an idol") tournament, a tournament designed to feature the younger wrestlers in CMLL, identifying one wrestler who is ready to move up the ranks of CMLL. Wrestlers would compete against each other in weekly matches and get points for the ring results, from a panel of judges and a weekly online poll. The tournament started with 16 wrestlers competing for the eight spots in the tournament in a torneo cibernetico elimination match; Star Jr. along with Cachorro, Cavernario, Dragon Lee, Guerrero Negro Jr., Hechicero, Soberano Jr. and Super Halcón Jr. qualified for the tournament while Black Panther, Canelo Casas, El Rebelde, Espiritu Negro, Flyer, Herodes Jr., Metálico and Oro Jr. were eliminated from the tournament. As part of the tournament Star Jr. was assigned Virus as a trainer who helped guide him through the matches from week to week. The first round of the tournament ran from April 1 through the end of May with one match per week for each wrestler. In the tournament Star Jr. defeated Dragon Lee, Guerrero Negro Jr. and Soberano Jr. but lost the remaining four matches. He ended the first round in fifth place, with 406 points, 17 points behind Dragon Lee and was eliminated from the tournament. Star Jr. began teaming regularly with former En Busca de un Ídolo rival Soberano Jr. to form a tag team that soon took the nickname Los Principes del Ring ("The Princes of the Ring"). In late 2014 Los Principes del Ring began a storyline feud with the team of veteran wrestlers Cholo and Ramstein with the main theme being that the veterans felt that Star Jr. and Soberano Jr. were disrespectful to the more experienced Cholo and Ramstein and wanted to teach the "brats" their proper place in CMLL. On December 30, 2014 the four men signed a contract to risk their masks in a Luchas de Apuestas, or bet match, to take place on January 6, 2015. In Lucha Libre winning an opponent's mask is considered the "ultimate prize". On January 6 Star Jr. and Soberano Jr. defeated Cholo and Ramstein in a two out of three falls match, forcing both of their opponents to unmask in front of the Arena México while revealing their real names. On April 7, 2015 Star Jr. broke the middle finger on his right had during a match where Star Jr and Soberano Jr. teamed up with Oro Jr., losing to Cancerbero, Raziel and Sangre Azteca. The injury would keep him out of the ring for 3 months. During his return it was revealed that the team of Star Jr. and Soberano was now officially called Los Principes Azules ("The Blue Princes") by CMLL. In his return on July 7, 2015 the team of Star Jr. Leono and Stigman defeated Cancerbero, Raziel and Metálico. In late October 2017, Star Jr. was announced to make his debut in Japan by participating in Fantastica Mania 2018, an eight night tour co-promoted by New Japan Pro-Wrestling.

Championships and accomplishment
Consejo Mundial de Lucha Libre
Gran Alternativa tournament (2019) – with Valiente

Luchas de Apuestas record

References

1993 births
Living people
Masked wrestlers
Mexican male professional wrestlers
Unidentified wrestlers
Professional wrestlers from Mexico City